Arene miniata is a species of sea snail, a marine gastropod mollusc in the family Areneidae.

References

External links
 To Biodiversity Heritage Library (2 publications)
 To Encyclopedia of Life
 To ITIS
 To World Register of Marine Species

Areneidae
Gastropods described in 1889